Milano City Football Club was a football club located in Busto Garolfo, Lombardy, Italy.

History 
On 28 June 2017, Milano City Football Club was founded as a continuation of Serie D club Bustese Calcio.

Following an Eccellenza campaign in the 2020–21 season, the club did not apply to play in the following one, thus being effectively dissolved.

References

External links 
 Official site

Defunct football clubs in Italy
Association football clubs established in 2017
Association football clubs disestablished in 2021
Football clubs in Milan
2017 establishments in Italy
2021 disestablishments in Italy